"Girls Can Be Cruel" is a song made by Australian electronica group, Infusion. The song was released in April 2004 as the lead single from the group's second studio album, Six Feet Above Yesterday. The song peaked at number 52 on the ARIA Charts.

At the ARIA Music Awards of 2004, the song won the ARIA Award for Best Dance Release.

Track listings

Charts

Release history

References

2004 singles
2004 songs
ARIA Award-winning songs